Cârlig may refer to several villages in Romania:

 Cârlig, a village in Popricani Commune, Iaşi County
 Cârlig, a village in Dulcești Commune, Neamţ County

See also 

Carlie
 Cârligi (disambiguation)
 Cârligei (disambiguation)
 Cîrligați (disambiguation)
 Cârligu River (disambiguation)
 Cârligele River (disambiguation)
 Cârlomănești (disambiguation)